Disney+ is an over-the-top subscription video on-demand service owned and operated by Disney Entertainment, that first launched in the United States on November 12, 2019, eventually expanding to other territories. It distributes a number of original specials, films, and documentaries. Its originals are created and produced by Disney-owned brands such as Walt Disney Pictures, 20th Century Studios, Disney Branded Television, Pixar, Marvel Studios, Lucasfilm and National Geographic.

Original films

Feature films

Documentaries

Specials
These films are one-time events or supplementary content related to original or Walt Disney Pictures films.

Shorts
These are specials that have a runtime of less than 20 minutes.

Livestreams

Non-English language

Feature films

Specials

Regional original films
These films are originals because Disney+ commissioned or acquired them and had their premiere on the service, but they are only available in specific Disney+ territories.

Exclusive films
These films premiered on the service without the Disney+ Original label. Availability may vary across regions.

Feature films

Documentaries

Shorts

Livestreams

Premier Access

Disney+ Premier Access is a premium release strategy for the global on-demand Internet streaming media provider, owned and operated by Disney. The Premier Access option was created to ensure people could still access major new releases in areas with closed movie theaters, due to the COVID-19 pandemic.

The first film released with Premier Access was the 2020 live-action release Mulan. The films are released to Disney+ in most markets on the same day as their theatrical release (with the exception of Mulan, which was only initially released through Premier Access), and can be accessed for a one-time payment of US$29.99 (or an approximately equivalent payment in local currency). Unlike other premium video-on-demand releases, which typically expire within 48 hours of first viewing, Premier Access films can be rewatched as many times as desired, provided the customer remains subscribed to Disney+. However, these films are eventually made available on Disney+ without the need for an additional payment, typically 60–90 days after release.

Jungle Cruise was the final film released in 2021 as part of the strategy, as Disney committed to giving the rest of their 2021 (and later, 2022) theatrical releases a minimum 45 day exclusivity window in theaters before becoming available through other outlets (like Disney+, Hulu, HBO Max, and/or transactional VOD, depending on the label the film was released under), with the exception of Encanto and Strange World, which were given a 30 day exclusivity window in theaters so Disney could make the films available on Disney+ in time for the holiday season.

Premier Access is not available in France. Mulan was instead made exclusively available in France via Disney+, at no additional charge, on December 4, 2020, the same date as it became available to the remaining Disney+ subscribers globally. The other Premier Access films received regular theatrical releases in France, but will not be available to stream on Disney+ in that country until at least 36 months after release, due to local regulations. Despite these regulations being revised to shorten the window in January 2022, Disney opposed them, stating that they were "not consumer friendly", and subsequently announced in June 2022 that Strange World would not receive a theatrical release in France and go straight to Disney+ in the region (following a theatrical release in other regions), with Disney also announcing that the status of their future theatrical releases in France would be determined on a case-by-case basis.

Upcoming films

Feature films

Documentaries

Specials

Shorts

Regional original films

See also
 List of Disney+ original programming
 List of Star original films

Notes

References

External links
 

Disney+
 
Lists of films by studio
Lists of films released by Disney